Constant Meriel (30 April 1907 – 2 July 1976) was a French racing cyclist. He rode in the 1929 Tour de France.

References

1907 births
1976 deaths
French male cyclists
Place of birth missing